Arthur Stewart (13 January 1942 – 3 March 2018) was a Northern Ireland international footballer who played with, among others, Glentoran, Derby County and Ballymena United in the 1960s and 1970s. Born in Ballymena, County Antrim, he won seven full international caps for Northern Ireland as well as five amateur caps and five inter-league caps for the Irish League.

Stewart joined Glentoran from Ballymena as a teenager in 1961, and became part of one of the most successful Glentoran teams in the mid- and late sixties, winning the Gold Cup in 1963, the Irish League championship in 1964 and the Irish Cup in 1965. In 1966–67 Stewart was part of the team which won the Ulster Cup, Gold Cup, City Cup and League championship. At the end of the season, he won his first cap for Northern Ireland in a 0–0 draw with Wales. He was part of the famous Detroit Cougars team which was the name given to Glentoran in the United Soccer Association championship in the summer of 1967.

In December of the next season, he transferred to Derby County in the English Second Division. After two-and-a-half seasons he returned to Northern Ireland to rejoin Ballymena in August 1970. He was appointed player-manager in 1971 and won the City Cup in his first season in charge: Ballymena's first trophy for eleven years. He earned the Ulster Footballer of the Year title in 1973/74 as Ballymena pushed close for honours, only to lose out to Ards in both the Irish Cup and Blaxnit Cup finals. Over the next few seasons success was limited to the Gold Cup, with a win in 1974 and a final defeat by Coleraine in 1975 preceding Stewart's departure early in 1976.

In March 1976, Stewart signed as a player with Distillery, but departed for a lucrative five-month spell in the American Soccer League with New Jersey Americans. He returned to the Irish League early in the 1976–77 season, taking in brief spells with Bangor and Cliftonville before he accepted a return to Glentoran as player-manager in May 1977. Stewart's role as both experienced tactician and seasoned player aided Glentoran to some early successes. They embarked on a European Cup campaign which would take them past Icelandic side Valur and within a whisker of a famous draw with Juventus. The Gold Cup was won again, but the League title lost to Linfield. In December 1978, Stewart resigned as Glentoran manager to take the over as head coach at New Jersey Americans. He returned to Northern Ireland as manager of Ballyclare Comrades in 1981 and later managed Ballymoney United.

References

External links 
Northern Ireland's Footballing Greats

1942 births
2018 deaths
Association footballers from Northern Ireland
Detroit Cougars (soccer) players
Northern Ireland international footballers
Ulster Footballers of the Year
Glentoran F.C. players
Glentoran F.C. managers
Derby County F.C. players
Ballymena United F.C. players
Ballymena United F.C. managers
Bangor F.C. players
Lisburn Distillery F.C. players
Cliftonville F.C. players
NIFL Premiership players
English Football League players
New Jersey Americans (ASL) players
American Soccer League (1933–1983) players
Expatriate association footballers from Northern Ireland
Expatriate soccer players in the United States
Expatriate sportspeople from Northern Ireland in the United States
Ballymoney United F.C. managers
Ballyclare Comrades F.C. managers
United Soccer Association players
Association football wing halves
Sportspeople from Ballymena
Football managers from Northern Ireland